James Paul Wheeler (born 5 February 1947) was a Welsh international full back who played club rugby for Aberavon. He won two caps for Wales including one against the 1967 touring New Zealand side.

International matches played

Wales
  1968
  1967

Bibliography

References 

Rugby union players from Newport, Wales
Wales international rugby union players
Welsh rugby union players
Rugby union fullbacks
1947 births
Swansea RFC players
Living people
Aberavon RFC players